Cedarview is an unincorporated community located in Desoto County, Mississippi, United States, south of Olive Branch along Mississippi Highway 305.

References

Unincorporated communities in DeSoto County, Mississippi
Unincorporated communities in Mississippi
Memphis metropolitan area